Sir Omar Faiek Shennib (Omar Fayek Shennib, Omar Shannib, Omar Shannaib) was Libyan Minister of Defence, Chief of the Royal Diwan, Vice President of the Libyan National Assembly  under the reign of King Idris Al Senussi. Omar Faiek Shennib was the patriarch of the House of Shennib, one of Libya's most prominent noble families.  The family has included notable public figures: heads of state, ministers, authors and diplomats. Omar Faiek Shennib Avenue in Derna was named after Shennib posthumously.

1941 Cyrenaican Delegation to the UN
Sir Shennib served as President of the Cyrenaican delegation to the United Nations in the post-war period and was instrumental in the creation of a unified Libyan state in the years immediately following World War II following the withdrawal of Axis forces from the North African coast. Together with Idris, Shennib was part of the 1941 delegation to the UN which put forth the case for the unification of the three traditional free standing regions, Cyrenaica, Tripolitania and Fezzan into the single nation state of Libya. Following independence on 24 December 1951, he was appointed Chief of the Royal Diwans

Libyan Independence and Flag of Libya

Omar Faiek Shennib is credited for the design of the independence Flag of Libya: this flag represented Libya from its independence until 1951 to 1969, and which was re-adopted by the rebel movement during the 2011 Libyan Civil War. According to the memoirs of Adrian Pelt, UN commissioner for Libya (1949 to 1951), “during deliberations of the Libyan National Constitutional Convention, a paper drawing of a proposed national flag was presented to the convention by Omar Faiek Shennib (distinguished member of the delegation from Cyrenaica). The design was composed of three colors; red, black and green, with a white Crescent and Star centered in the middle black stripe. Mr. Shennib informed the delegates that this design had met the approval of His Highness Emir of Cyrenaica, King Idris Al Senussi (later to become King of Libya). The assembly subsequently approved that design.”.

Vice Presidency of the Libyan National Assembly 
Shennib served as Vice President of the Libyan National Assembly until his death in 1953, and was a signatory to the first Libyan Constitution (later amended in 1961)

Notes

1953 deaths
Government ministers of Libya
Libyan diplomats
Defence ministers of Libya
1883 births
People from Derna, Libya
Flag designers